Dendroseris macrophylla is a species of flowering plant in the family Asteraceae.
It is found only in the Juan Fernández Islands of Chile.
It is threatened by habitat loss.

References

Sources

macrophylla
Endemic flora of the Juan Fernández Islands
Critically endangered plants
Taxonomy articles created by Polbot